The canton of Autun-2 is an administrative division of the Saône-et-Loire department, eastern France. It was created at the French canton reorganisation which came into effect in March 2015. Its seat is in Autun.

It consists of the following communes:
 
Antully
Autun (partly)
Auxy
La Boulaye
Brion
Broye
La Chapelle-sous-Uchon
Charbonnat
Charmoy
La Comelle
Dettey
Étang-sur-Arroux
La Grande-Verrière
Laizy
Marmagne
Mesvres
Saint-Didier-sur-Arroux
Saint-Émiland
Saint-Eugène
Saint-Léger-sous-Beuvray
Saint-Martin-de-Commune
Saint-Nizier-sur-Arroux
Saint-Prix
Saint-Symphorien-de-Marmagne
La Tagnière
Thil-sur-Arroux
Uchon

References

Cantons of Saône-et-Loire